Kulshan may refer to:

Mount Baker, a volcano in Washington, U.S.
Kulshan (steamship), a steamship in Washington, U.S.
Kulshan Caldera, a volcano in Washington, U.S.